The Legazpi-Sikatuna Blood Compact or Sandugo (Spanish: Pacto de Sangre) was a blood compact, performed in the island of Bohol in the Philippines, between the Spanish explorer Miguel López de Legazpi and Datu Sikatuna the chieftain of Bohol on March 16, 1565, to seal their friendship as part of the tribal tradition. This is considered as the first treaty of friendship between the Spaniards and Filipinos. "Sandugo"  is a Visayan word which means "one blood".

The Sandugo is depicted in both the provincial flag and the official seal of the government in Bohol. It also features the image of the blood compact. The top of the seal explains the history behind the Sandugo event that occurred in Bohol, the fleet and the location where the Spaniards anchored and the place where the treaty was conducted which was dated on March 16, 1565.

History

In 1521, navigator Ferdinand Magellan arriving on a Spanish expedition to the Moluccas became the first person from Europe to reach Asia by sailing west, a voyage of which he would meet an untimely death in the island of the Philippines. Spain sent expeditions to colonize the East Indies in their competition with Portugal to seize control over the spice trade. However, all of these expeditions failed. It was not until Miguel López de Legazpi, sailing from Mexico with five ships and five hundred men, reached the Philippines in 1565 and a Spanish settlement was established. López de Legazpi was greeted by hostile Muslim tribes opposing a foreign invasion. His attempt to land on the island of Cebu resulted in the death of one of his soldiers prompting him to explore another island and seek trade with various tribes.

Sailing south toward the island of Mindanao, López de Legazpi's fleet encountered highwinds forcing them to sail northward to the island of Bohol. There, he captured a vessel from Borneo whose Malay sailors informed the Spaniards that the natives inhabiting the region traded with people from Borneo and Indonesia. Arriving in Bohol, López de Legazpi noticed the hostility of the people. The Malayan servant explained that such hostility was due to the expeditions conducted by the Portuguese from the Moluccas islands. In 1563, Portuguese fleets arrived in Visayan waters and enslaved about 1,000 inhabitants. López de Legazpi, with the help of the Malayan sailor, explained to the tribes in Bohol that they were not Portuguese and that they had come to the islands to trade. Upon learning this, the chieftains and their tribes became friendlier and welcoming to the Spaniards.

Ceremony
The Sandugo began with the arrival of Miguel López de Legazpi in Bohol in 1565 and the establishment of allegiance by Datu Sikatuna to the king of Spain. They made a cut on their left arm with a dagger and poured their blood into a cup filled with wine, which they both drank in honour of their friendship. The inscription at a monument in Tagbilaran City describes the event:

It added that the compact was performed as part of the tribal tradition.

In his report to Philip II, López de Legazpi wrote:

Tradition

By performing a blood compact, it preserves the bond of friendship between two tribes. This ceremony was the first treaty or bond of friendship between the natives, and the Spaniards. In honor of this ceremony, the former President of the Philippines Elpidio Quirino established the Order of Sikatuna, a presidential decoration conferred upon politicians. Juan Luna, a Filipino painter, depicted this event in his painting entitled The Blood Compact (Spanish: El Pacto de Sangre) in 1883. El Pacto de Sangre obtained the first prize in Paris in 1885 and at the Louisiana Purchase Exposition of St. Louis in 1904. At that period, it was an important part for tribes to perform the sandugo as part of the peace process. A monument was constructed in Tagbilaran City by the Philippine Historical Committee and the National Historical Institute.

See also

Tagayan
History of the Philippines

References

Publications
Agoncillo, Teodoro A. History of the Filipino People. GAROTECH Publishing, 1990 (8th Edition).
Arcila, José S. Rizal and the Emergence of the Philippine Nation. 2001 revised edition.
Constantino, Renato. The Philippines: A Past Revisited. Tala Publishing Series, 1975.
Corpuz, Onofre D. The Roots of the Filipino Nation. 1989.
Scott, William Henry. Barangay: Sixteenth-Century Philippine Culture and Society. AdMU: 1994.
Zaide, Gregorio F. Great Filipinos in History: An Epic of Filipino Greatness in War and Peace. Verde Bookstore, 1970.
Zaide, Gregorio. Dagohoy: Champion of Philippine Freedom. Manila: Enriquez, Alduan and Co., 1941.

External links

 Blood Compact Site on SerialTripper.com

History of Bohol
Visayan history
History of the Philippines (1565–1898)
Treaties of the Spanish Empire
Treaties of the Philippines
1565 treaties
16th century in the Philippines
1565 in the Philippines